Athens High School is the only high school in the Athens City Schools System.

Sports

Soccer
The Lady Golden Eagles have gone to the final four five years in a row and went on to win second in the state in 2012. They also won the 2013 tournament.

Football
The school won the 2006 state championship, the third in the school's history after 1975 and 1976)

School aluminas Philip Rivers was a successful quarterback for the Chargers and Colts of the National Football League. He has the most passing yards for any quarterback who never reached a Super Bowl.

Softball
In 2005, the Lady Eagles won area competition and went on to the state championship where they took home third place in 5A play. In 2010, the Golden Eagles won the state championship, scoring two upsets over top-ranked Mortimer Jordan High School in the finals.

Basketball
Keith Askins is a retired NBA basketball player who played for the Miami Heat. Also, more recently, Richard Hendrix was an NBA power forward for the Golden State Warriors from Athens High. He currently plays overseas in Europe.

Swimming

At the 2013 Alabama High School Athletic Association Swimming and Diving Championships,  the Women's 200 yard Freestyle relay finished 1st with a time of 1:38.50, breaking Bob Jones High School's 2007 state record in the event.

Wrestling
The wrestling team has won six state titles, the first coming in 1988 and the last coming in 1998.

Band
In 2010, The AHS Golden Eagle marching band won state in the Pride of Hayden Marching Festival. Also, they won all trophies in their second competition and 8th in their third at Jacksonville State University.  They have a drumline consisting of 5 basses, 3 snares, 2 tenors, and a front ensemble. The drumline also had an indoor drumline in 2011 consisting of 4 basses, 2 snares,  2 tenors, and a pit. The band also has an auxiliary section, including color guard and majorettes.

JROTC
Founded in the mid-1970s, Athens High School is the only school in Limestone County to have a Junior ROTC program. They have a Saber Honor Guard, Rifle Team, Drill Team, and Raider Team. .

Notable alumni 
 Mike Anderson, musician who goes by the name Anderson East
 Keith Askins, Retired NBA basketball player for the Miami Heat
 Don Black (white supremacist), attended before transferring his senior year.
 Dick Coffman, Former MLB player (Washington Senators, St. Louis Browns, New York Giants, Boston Bees, Philadelphia Phillies)
 Slick Coffman, Former MLB player (Detroit Tigers, Saint Louis Browns)
 Richard Hendrix, NBA power forward for Golden State Warriors (2008) 19th pick 2nd Round
 Alfred McCullough, American football player
 Philip Rivers, former NFL quarterback for Los Angeles Chargers (2004–2019), Indianapolis Colts (2020)
 Lee Vickers, NFL tight end for Pittsburgh Steelers (2006), Philadelphia Eagles (2006), Baltimore Ravens (2007) Pittsburgh Steelers (2008), New York Giants (2009), Washington Redskins (2010–2012)
 Quez Watkins, NFL wide receiver for the Philadelphia Eagles (current)

References

External links
Athens High School

Huntsville-Decatur, AL Combined Statistical Area
Public high schools in Alabama
Schools in Limestone County, Alabama
1973 establishments in Alabama
Educational institutions established in 1973